"Announcement" is the second single released by Common from his 2008 album Universal Mind Control. The single was produced by The Neptunes and features Pharrell. The song was released as a 3-track digital EP. It samples "Dreams" by The Notorious B.I.G.

Track listing
Digital EP
"Announcement" (Explicit) - 3:58
"Universal Mind Control (UMC)" (Explicit) - 3:26
"Universal Mind Control (UMC) [Instrumental]"

Chart positions

References

2008 singles
Common (rapper) songs
Pharrell Williams songs
GOOD Music singles
Song recordings produced by the Neptunes
Songs written by Pharrell Williams
Songs written by Common (rapper)
2008 songs
Geffen Records singles
Songs written by Chad Hugo